Marie, Duchess of Anhalt (née Princess Sophie Marie of Baden; 26 July 1865 - 29 November 1939) was the wife and consort of Friedrich II, Duke of Anhalt. She was the last Duchess of Anhalt, as German royal and noble titles were abolished in 1919 during the Weimar Republic.

Biography 
Princess Sophie Marie Luise Amelie Josephine of Baden was born on 26 July 1865 to Prince William of Baden and Princess Maria Maximilianovna of Leuchtenberg. Her paternal grandparents were Leopold, Grand Duke of Baden and Princess Sophie of Sweden. Her maternal grandparents were Maximilian de Beauharnais, 3rd Duke of Leuchtenberg and Grand Duchess Maria Nikolaevna of Russia. She was a great-granddaughter of both Gustav IV Adolf of Sweden and Nicholas I of Russia. Marie was a sister of Prince Maximilian of Baden, Chancellor of the German Empire.

On 2 July 1889 she married Friedrich, Hereditary Prince of Anhalt in Karlsruhe. The marriage was childless. In 1904 her husband ascended the throne as the Duke of Anhalt. Her husband died in 1918. She died in 1939 in Baden-Baden.

Ancestry

References 

1865 births
1939 deaths
19th-century German women
20th-century German women
Duchesses of Anhalt
Marie
Royal reburials